Stellenbosch is a town in the Western Cape province of South Africa, situated about  east of Cape Town, along the banks of the Eerste River at the foot of the Stellenbosch Mountain. The town became known as the City of Oaks or Eikestad in Afrikaans and Dutch due to the large number of oak trees that were planted by its founder, Simon van der Stel, to grace the streets and homesteads.

Stellenbosch has its own municipality (incorporating the neighbouring towns of Pniel and Franschhoek), adjoining the metropolitan area of the City of Cape Town. The town is home to Stellenbosch University. Technopark is a modern science park situated on the southern side of the town near the Stellenbosch Golf Course.

Prehistory 

In 1899 Louis Péringuey discovered Paleolithic stone tools of the Acheulean type at a site named Bosman's Crossing near the Adam Tas Bridge at the western entrance to Stellenbosch.

History 

The town was founded in 1679 by the Governor of the Cape Colony, Simon van der Stel, who named it after himself – Stellenbosch means "(van der) Stel's Bush". It is situated on the banks of the Eerste River ("First River"), so named as it was the first new river he reached and followed when he went on an expedition over the Cape Flats to explore the territory towards what is now known as Stellenbosch.

The Dutch were skilled in hydraulic engineering and they devised a system of furrows to direct water from the Eerste River in the vicinity of Thibault Street through the town along van Riebeeck Street to Mill Street where a mill was erected. Early visitors commented on the oak trees and gardens.

During 1690 some Huguenot refugees settled in Stellenbosch, grapes were planted in the fertile valleys around Stellenbosch and soon it became the centre of the South African wine industry.

In 1710 a fire destroyed most of the town, including the first church, all the Company property and twelve houses. Only two or three houses were left standing. When the church was rebuilt in 1723 it was located on what was then the outskirts of the town, to prevent any similar incident from destroying it again. This church was enlarged a number of times since 1723 and is currently known as the "Moederkerk" (Mother Church).

The first school had been opened in 1683, but education in the town began in earnest in 1859 with the opening of a seminary for the Dutch Reformed Church. Rhenish Girls' High School, established in 1860, is the oldest school for girls in South Africa. A gymnasium, known as het Stellenbossche Gymnasium, was established in 1866. In 1874 some higher classes became Victoria College and then in 1918 University of Stellenbosch. The first men's hostel to be established in Stellenbosch was Wilgenhof, in 1903. In 1905 the first women's hostel to be established in Stellenbosch was Harmonie . Harmonie and Wilgenhof were part of the Victoria College. In 1909 an old boy of the school, Paul Roos, captain of the first national rugby team to be called the Springboks, was invited to become the sixth rector of the school. He remained rector until 1940. On his retirement, the school's name was changed to Paul Roos Gymnasium.

In the early days of the Second Boer War (1899–1902) Stellenbosch was one of the British military bases, and was used as a "remount" camp; and in consequence of officers who had not distinguished themselves at the front being sent back to it, the expression "to be Stellenbosched" came into use; so much so, that in similar cases officers were spoken of as "Stellenbosched" even if they were sent to some other place.

Population 
Roughly 70% of the residents spoke Afrikaans as their home language, 2% spoke isiXhosa, and 21% spoke English. 15% of the population identified themselves as "Black African", 16% as "Coloured", and 67% as "White".

The Stellenbosch Municipality extends beyond the town of Stellenbosch itself to include rural areas, villages, and the town of Franschhoek. At the time of the 2011 census, the municipal population was 155,728, while by 2016 it was estimated to be 173,197. In 2017, the municipality estimated that the population in 2018 would increase to 176,523

The 1936 census recorded a total population of 8,782 residents with 3,558 of them recorded as Coloured and 4,995 recorded as White.

Climate and geography

To the south is Stellenbosch Mountain; to the east and southeast are the Jonkershoek, Drakenstein, and Simonsberg mountains. Just south of the Helderberg Nature Reserve is Strand, a seaside resort town. The soils of Stellenbosch range from dark alluvium to clay. This, combined with the well-drained, hilly terrain and Mediterranean climate, prove excellent for viticulture. Winters are cool, rainy and sometimes quite windy, with daytime temperatures averaging . Snow is usually seen a couple of times in winter on the surrounding mountains. Spring and autumn are colder seasons, when daytime temperatures hover in the 20s.

Economy 
Other than viticulture and winemaking and the small size of the town, Stellenbosch is home to several corporate headquarters of large and small companies including major South African bank, Capitec Bank, fast-food chain, Hungry Lion, major dairy products group Lactalis South  Africa (subsidiary of French dairy products company group, Lactalis), major private hospital group, Mediclinic International and investment holding company, Remgro.

Sport 
Stellenbosch is a warm weather training venue for cyclists, track and field squads, and triathletes. The Stellenbosch Sports Academy opened its doors in 2012 and hosts several rugby teams on a permanent basis, such as the 
Springbok Sevens and Western Province.

Viticulture and winemaking

The Stellenbosch, Paarl and Franschhoek valleys form the Cape Winelands, the larger of the two main wine growing regions in South Africa. The South African wine industry produces about 1,000,000,000 litres of wine annually. Stellenbosch is the primary location for viticulture and viticulture research. Professor Perold was the first Professor of Viticulture at Stellenbosch University. The Stellenbosch Wine Route established in 1971 by Frans Malan from Simonsig, Spatz Sperling from Delheim, Neil Joubert from Spier and David van Velden from Overgaauw, known as Stellenbosch American Express® Wine Routes since 2002, is a world-renowned and popular tourist destination. This route provides visitors the opportunity to experience a wide range of cultivars and includes farms such as Warwick and JC Le Roux.

The region has a Mediterranean climate with hot dry summers and cool wet winters. Stellenbosch lies at the foot of the Cape Fold mountain range, which provides soil favourable to viticulture. Grapes grown in this area are mainly used for wine production, as opposed to table grapes. The region possesses a wide range of soils in the area, from light, sandy soils to decomposed granite. Stellenbosch Cabernet Sauvignon is beginning to get a good reputation as a fine wine.

Stellenbosch University 

Stellenbosch University is one of South Africa's leading universities. This institution has a rich history dating back to 1863 and has 10 faculties, including Engineering, Commerce, Science and Arts. The Department of Electrical and Electronic Engineering is the only university department in the southern hemisphere which has successfully built a communications satellite Sunsat which was launched in 2000 and orbited the earth for three years.

The University currently has about 29,000 students. White students in 2014, namely 18 636, constitute 63.4% of all students enrolled. Although the official language of the university is Afrikaans, most post-graduate courses are presented in English. The university is in the process of introducing more English centered undergraduate courses following mass protest by the student body. The university council with the concurrence of the senate approved a new language policy on 22 June 2016 for implementation from 1 January 2017. Since the campuses are situated in the Western Cape, the university has committed to introducing multilingualism by using the province’s three official languages, namely Afrikaans, English and isiXhosa.

List of suburbs 

Annandale
Arbeidslus
Brandwacht
Cloetesville
Coetzenburg
Dalsig
Dennesig
De Zalze
De Novo
Devon Valley
Die Boord, previously Rhodes Fruit Farms
Die Rant
Ida's Valley
Jamestown
Jonkershoek
Karindal
Kayamandi
Klapmuts
Koelenhof
Krigeville
Kylemore
Welbedaght
La Colline
Lanquedoc
Meerlust
Mostertsdrift
Onderpapegaaiberg, also known as Voëltjiesdorp
Paradyskloof
Plankenberg
Pniel
Raithby
Rozendal
Simondium
Simonsrust	
Simonswyk
Techno Park
Tennantville
Town central
Uniepark
Universiteitsoord
Vlottenburg
Weides
Welbedaght
Welgevonden

List of schools 

A.F. Louw Primary School
Bloemhof High School
Bruckner De Villiers Primary School
Cloetesville High School
Cloetesville Primary School
Devonvallei Primary School
Eikestad Primary School
Idasvallei Primary School
Ikaya Primary School
JJ Rhode Primary School
Kayamandi Secondary School
Koelenhof Primary School
Luckhoff Secondary School
Lynedoch Primary School
Pieter Langeveldt Primary School
Paul Roos Gymnasium
Rhenish Girls' High School
Rhenish Primary School
Rietenbosch Primary School
Stellenbosch High School
Stellenbosch Primary School
Stellenzicht Senior Secondary
St. Idas R.C.Primary School
Weber Gedenk Primary School

Transport

Rail 
Stellenbosch lies on the Muldersvlei rail branch of the Northern Line operated by Metrorail Western Cape commuter rail system which connects Stellenbosch to Cape Town in the west via Eersterivier, Kuilsrivier and Bellville. Stellenbosch has two railway stations including its main railway station, Stellenbosch Railway Station to the east of the CBD along the R310 Adam Tas Road and Du Toit Railway Station to the north of the CBD in Plankenberg.

Roads 

Stellenbosch’s main street is “Bird Street” which stretches from the railway bridge in Tenantville in the north to Dorp Street in the CBD. Despite the town not having direct access to a freeway/highway, it is indirectly connected to the N1 highway (to Cape Town and Paarl) via the R304 and R44, the N2 highway (to Cape Town and George) via the R44 and R310 and the R300 highway (to Mitchells Plain and Bellville) via the M12. Stellenbosch also remains well-connected as it is intersected by three regional routes, the R44, R304 and R310.

 The R44 enters Stellenbosch from Klapmuts and Wellington in the north as “Adam Tas Road”, co-signs with the R310 to the west of the town and after the R310 diverts from the road, it continues south towards Somerset West and Strand as “Strand Road”. 
 The R304 begins at the intersection with the R310/R44, north of the CBD and proceeds north towards Klipheuwel and Atlantis as “Bird Street” and then “Koelenhof Road” after the railway bridge in Tenantville. 
 The R310 enters Stellenbosch from Pniel in the north-west as “Helshoogte Road”, co-signs with the R44 to the west of the town and becomes “Adam Tas Road”. After diverting from the R44, it continues south-west towards Muizenberg.

Stellenbosch is also linked indirectly to nearby commenter towns in the City of Cape Town other than Somerset West by the M12 and M23. 
 The M12 (Polkadraai Road) begins 5 km outside Stellenbosch at the intersection with the R310 and runs westwards towards Kuilsrivier and the Cape Town International Airport. 
 The M23 (Bottelary Road) begins 8 km outside Stellenbosch at the intersection with the R304 and runs towards Brackenfell, Kuilsrivier and Bellville, north-west of Stellenbosch.

Notable people 

Ferdie Bergh – rugby player
Kees Bruynzeel – Dutch businessman, timber merchant and yachtsman
Dirk Coetsee – Chancellor (Hoofdheemraad) of the District of Stellenbosch and Drakenstein in South Africa for most of the 1690s and early 1700s
Danie Craven – rugby administrator
Giniel de Villiers – Rally driver
David Earl – composer and pianist
Arnu Fourie – Paralympic athlete
Justin Harding - Golfer 
Omar Henry – cricketer
Daniel Hugo – radio producer, lecturer and poet
Charl Langeveldt – cricketer 
Lee Langeveldt – football player
D. F. Malan – Prime Minister of South Africa from 1948 to 1954
Jannie Marais (Johannes Henoch Marais) – mining magnate, politician and philanthropist who co-founded the multi-billion dollar media conglomerate Naspers and the University of Stellenbosch
JP Pietersen – rugby player
Paul Roos – South African rugby union captain
Anton Rupert – entrepreneur, businessman, conservationist
Johann Rupert – businessman 
Dana Snyman – journalist, writer and playwright 
Conrad Stoltz – 2-time Olympian, 3 time Xterra world champion 
Roger Telemachus – cricketer
Sampie Terreblanche – Professor in Economics, co-founder of Democratic Party
Richard Turner – philosopher
Frederik van Zyl Slabbert – anti-apartheid Member of Parliament and leader of opposition, lecturer in sociology
Hendrik Verwoerd – Prime Minister of South Africa from 1958 to 1966

Coats of arms
The municipality currently uses a badge consisting of a fleur de lis and a cross issuing from a stylised bunch of grapes. In the past, the various local authorities used coats of arms.

 Drostdy – The drostdy (1685–1827) was the local authority for the whole Stellenbosch district, including the city. In 1804, when the Cape Colony was ruled by the Batavian Republic, the government assigned an armorial seal to the drostdy. It depicted the shield of arms of Simon van der Stel superimposed on an anchor representing Hope, on a golden background. In 1814, the British occupation authorities ordered the drostdyen to use the royal coat of arms instead. Van der Stel's arms were quartered: 1 two red towers on a golden background; 2 a peacock on a red background; 3 three silver discs or balls stacked 1 over 2 on a red background; 4 a red tower on a golden background. In the centre was a smaller blue shield displaying six silver crescents (or, possibly, ribs) 2, 2, and 2.
 Municipality (1) – The Stellenbosch municipality was formed in 1840, to administer the city, but not the rest of the district. Although it was not the legal successor to the drostdy, it adopted the old drostdy seal of arms. A few changes were made to the arms over the years: quarters 2 and 3 were changed from red to blue; the peacock was turned to a profile position; the three silver discs or balls were changed to golden rings; the central shield was changed from blue to black. Whether any of these changes was intentional, or whether they were the result of artistic errors, is unclear.
 Municipality (2) – The municipal council had a new coat of arms designed by Michael Dawes in 1951. After some improvements, the College of Arms granted them on 26 June 1952. They were registered at the Bureau of Heraldry on 31 August 1979. The new design was a golden shield displaying the three towers from the Van der Stel arms, and a red fess displaying the peacock between golden rings. The crest was an anchor entwined with oak leaves and acorns. The motto Fortis et superbus ("Strong and proud") was chosen.
 Divisional council (1) – The divisional council, established in 1855, administered the rural areas outside the city. At some point, it adopted the plain Van der Stel arms, i.e. a golden shield displaying three red towers.

 Divisional council (2) – The divisional council had its arms re-designed by Cornelis Pama in 1970, and registered them at the Bureau of Heraldry on 30 October 1970. The shield was divided down the centre into gold and red, and the three towers were counterchanged. A red tower was added as a crest.
 Kaya Mandi – The local authority for the Black township of Kaya Mandi registered arms at the Bureau on 27 November 1987.

See also 
 Tygerberg Zoo
 Van Breda murders

References

External links 

Stellenbosch Municipality
Stellenbosch Tourism Bureau
Eikestad Nuus 

 
Wine regions of South Africa
Populated places established in 1679
Populated places founded by Afrikaners
Populated places in the Stellenbosch Local Municipality
1679 establishments in the Dutch Empire
Populated places established by the Dutch East India Company